Alan Louis Selman (April 2, 1941 – January 22, 2021) was a mathematician and theoretical computer scientist known for his research on structural complexity theory, the study of computational complexity in terms of the relation between complexity classes rather than individual algorithmic problems.

Education and career
Selman was a graduate of the City College of New York. He earned a master's degree at the University of California, Berkeley before completing his Ph.D. in 1970 at Pennsylvania State University. His dissertation, Arithmetical Reducibilities and Sets of Formulas Valid in Finite Structures, was supervised by Paul Axt, a student of Stephen Cole Kleene.

He became a postdoctoral researcher at Carnegie Mellon University, and an assistant professor of mathematics at Florida State University, before moving to the computer science department of Iowa State University, eventually becoming a full professor there. In the late 1980s he moved to Northeastern University, becoming acting dean there, and in 1990 he moved again to the University at Buffalo as chair of computer science. He retired in 2014, and died on January 22, 2021.

He was the first chair of the annual Computational Complexity Conference, and served as editor-in-chief of the journal Theory of Computing Systems for 18 years, beginning in 2001.

Selected publications
Selman's research publications included well-cited works on the classification of different types of reductions according to their computational power, the formulation of promise problems, the complexity class UP of problems solvable by unambiguous Turing machines, and their applications to the computational complexity of cryptography:

As well as being the editor of several edited volumes, Selman was the coauthor of the textbook Computability and Complexity Theory (with Steve Homer, Springer, 2001; 2nd ed., 2011).

Recognition
Selman was a Fulbright Scholar and Humboldt Fellow. He was named an ACM Fellow in 1998, as "an influential contributor to computational complexity theory and a dedicated professional within the academic computer science community". In 2002, ACM SIGACT (the Special Interest Group on Algorithms and Computation Theory of the Association for Computing Machinery) gave him their Distinguished Service Prize, noting his work in helping to found the Computational Complexity Conference and in helping to fund theoretical computer science research through his work drafting policy reports for the National Science Foundation.

The journal Theory of Computing Systems is organizing a commemorative issue celebrating his memory.

References

External links

1941 births
2021 deaths
20th-century American mathematicians
21st-century American mathematicians
American computer scientists
Theoretical computer scientists
City College of New York alumni
University of California, Berkeley alumni
Pennsylvania State University alumni
Florida State University faculty
Iowa State University faculty
Fellows of the Association for Computing Machinery